Octomeria tricolor is a species of orchid endemic to southeastern Brazil.

References

External links 

tricolor
Endemic orchids of Brazil